Melt (or Dissolve: A Work in Progress Compilation) is a various artists compilation album released in 1992 by Work in Progress. It was later reissued on May 7, 1996 by Fused Coil, a division of Fifth Colvmn Records.

Reception
In their review of the re-issue of Melt , Aiding & Abetting said "many of these tracks are immaculately and meticulously produced sets of noise" and "you can feel the texture and luxuriate in the quality."

Track listing

Personnel
Adapted from the Melt liner notes.

 Andrew Firman – cover art, illustrations
 Freek Kinkelaar – cover art

Release history

References

External links 
 

1992 compilation albums
Fifth Colvmn Records compilation albums